Jari Jääskeläinen (born 23 August 1981) is a Finnish former professional ice hockey player who last played for JYP of the SM-liiga.

References

External links

Living people
JYP Jyväskylä players
1981 births
Finnish ice hockey forwards
Sportspeople from Jyväskylä
21st-century Finnish people